Mindie Burgoyne is an American writer and businessperson. She works for the Maryland Department of Business and Economic Development and has written several books about the history and folklore of the Eastern Shore of Maryland. She is the founder and owner of Chesapeake Ghost Walks.

Background
Burgoyne has lived in the Baltimore–Washington metropolitan area for most of her life. At age 16, she composed a musical score for a promotional film, some of which was later used on national television.

Since 1991, Burgoyne has led an annual archeological field trip to Ireland. In 2002, she worked for the Snow Hill town government. She owned a business development company before working for the Maryland Department of Business and Economic Development as a business development representative from 2005. In 2005, she also founded the Tourism, Arts, and Downtown Development (TADD) collective to help coordinate business resources across the state. Burgoyne has also worked as a business development representative and a field reporter for the Government of Maryland.

Writing

Burgoyne's first two books, Snow Hill and Easton, are part of Arcadia Publishing's  "Images of America" series. Snow Hill is a historical book containing stories and photographs of Snow Hill, Maryland. 

Burgoyne researched folklore for three years at Salisbury University for her 2009 book Haunted Eastern Shore, which she was inspired to write after moving into a house where she sensed hauntings. The book is a compilation of stories about the Eastern Shore. By 2015, Haunted Eastern Shore had sold 10,000 copies. In 2015, Burgoyne published The Haunted Mid-Shore, a book that contains 25 stories from Maryland's mid-shore region. It is the second of a three-book series about the folklore of the Delmarva Peninsula.

Burgoyne also conducts tours of supposedly haunted sites following stories from her books.

Personal life 
Burgoyne maintains a travel blog and writes about a variety of topics. In 2002, she and her husband, Dan, moved to the Vance Miles House in Marion Station, Maryland. They have six children.

Works

References

External links
 

21st-century American women writers
Year of birth missing (living people)
Living people
Writers from Maryland
People from Somerset County, Maryland
21st-century American businesswomen
21st-century American businesspeople
American women company founders
American company founders
Businesspeople from Maryland